Soubry is a surname. Notable people with the surname include:

 Anna Soubry (born 1956), British politician
 Paul Soubry, Canadian business executive

French-language surnames